Kingsley Hall is at 59 Old Market Street in Old Market, Bristol.

The hall was built as a private house in 1706 and restored in the late 19th century for use as a political club and office premises. It was originally occupied by the East Bristol Conservative Party. In 1911, it became the Bristol headquarters of the Independent Labour Party who renamed it in honour of the Christian Socialist Charles Kingsley. It is now used as offices by 1625 Independent People, a charity housing young people.

It has been designated by English Heritage as a grade II* listed building.

See also
 Grade II* listed buildings in Bristol

References

Grade II* listed buildings in Bristol
Houses completed in 1706
Houses in Bristol
Independent Labour Party
1706 establishments in England
Georgian architecture in Bristol